Mangere United is a community football club football (soccer) club in Mangere, Auckland, New Zealand. They are currently a member of the Auckland Football Federation.

In 2018, Mangere United went in a partnership with fellow South Auckland club Manukau City to form Manukau United, who currently play in the NRFL Premier.

History

In 2000 it became evident that there was a large Fijian Indian population in Auckland including young men who played or wished to play football with an established club. The founders of the club then saw the need for a football club in Auckland to provide players of Fijian origin and chose Mangere as a suitable location due to the concentration of Fijian Indian's in the area. The founders of the Club are Mr Mohammed Imran (former president), Mr James Kado (former secretary, now Chairman), Mr Patrick Herman (former manager) and Mr Ramu Prasad (former coach).

Playing strip and emblem

The founders decided on a black strip because no other club in Auckland seemed to use those colours.  Coincidentally, it also includes one colour of the Fijian national football team kit. Black strip is also colours of Fijian giants Ba FC.

The Fijian Indian element can be seen on their emblem with a Fijian whale tooth carving holding a prominent place.

Background

The club has a distinctly Fijian-Indian feel with the majority of players having a Fijian-Indian origin, being either born in Fiji or resided or recently moved to New Zealand. Due to that, the style of play often resembles creative passing, strong running and exciting football to watch.

The only other successful New Zealand football clubs with ethnic origins are Wellington Olympic AFC (Greek), Central United (Croatian) and to some extent Wellington United (Dutch and – historically – Hungarian).

Home ground

The club's home ground is Centre Park in Mangere. It previously housed a club rooms, which burnt down in 2005. A major renovation of the ground saw a small stadium being built in 2011, along with landscaping of an embankment area for further seating. The ground is home of ethnic and Fijian tournaments in Auckland and junior and women's international games have been held.

Derby

While there are many other football clubs in close proximity to the club, a loose derby exists with Onehunga-Mangere United due to name and location similarities between the clubs.  In the derby context, Mangere United is known as Onehunga-Mangere United's cousins from the valley (Onehunga-Mangere United's home ground being on top of an extinct volcano).

Interesting facts

Mangere United's war cry commences before each game without fail. It includes all players entering into a huddle immediately prior to kick off on the field each player placing one hand in the centre and counting down from 3 to then yell "Mangere!" while thrusting hands into the sky.

It is, along with Central United and South Auckland Rangers, the last remaining ethnic club in Auckland. Despite this, the club welcomes players of all nationalities and includes several players of non Fijian origin on its roster.

The lingua franca spoken by the players during games is Fijian Hindi with English generally only spoken to players of a non Fijian origin.

The club was set for promotion to the Lotto Sport Italia NRFL Division 1 when it played the 2009 promotion match with Papatoetoe AFC. In spectacular fashion, over half of the first team roster made themselves unavailable after accepting invitations to play in a Fijian-Indian football tournament in Los Angeles, United States on the same weekend. Not surprisingly, the club lost out on promotion.

The team always says a pray in a huddle in the changing room before each game.

The year 2009 was a season of sorts.  After losing 8 games in the first round and sitting second to last at the wrong end of the standings, relegation looked inevitable.  The signing of Kindness Agwu and David Firisua plus the newly found form of Justin Fredickson and Safraz Ali marked a turn-around for the club.  The team went on an amazing 14 games undefeated (drawing only twice) to close out the season in 4th place.

Honours

In 2001  the club won the Northern League Division Three. In 2002 the club won the Northern League Division Two.

The club has played in the Norther Premier League 3 times before (2004, 2005, 2006) with its best placing an 8th out of 14 teams in 2004.

The club's best record in the Chatham Cup is reaching the last 16 in 2004. It lost 1–2 to Waitakere United.

Mangere United are the Lotto Sport Italia NRFL Division 2 2010 Champions.

Notable players

Mangere United has several former and current players who have represented their country at various levels:

 Vishal Lal – Played for Fiji at U17 (1999 U17 World Cup Oceania qualifiers) and national futsal level.
 Sumendra Pooni – Played for Fiji at U17 (1999 U17 World Cup Oceania qualifiers) level.
 Thabiso Elliot Tleane- played for Pretoria university fc 
 Justin Fredrickson – Played for New Zealand at U16 level.
 Naveen Prasad – Played for New Zealand at U16 and U17 level.
 Stu Bola – Played for Fiji at senior level.
 David Firisua – Played for Solomon Islands at senior level.
 Johnny Worley – Played for New Zealand at Secondary Schools level.
 Surfsraz Ali Akbar – Played for Fiji at U17, U19, U21 and U23.
 Sumeet Shankaran- "Played for Fiji at U20 and U23".
 William Lasaqa- Played for Fiji at senior level.
 Krishna Samy- Played for Fiji at senior level.
 Sanni Issa- Played for Auckland City FC.
 Mario Billen- Played for Croatia at Youth Level.
 Salesh Kumar- Played for Fiji at senior level.
 Shameel Rao- Played for Fiji at senior level.
 Ernesto Lopez- Played for NZ at Futsal Competitions.
 Dae Wook Kim- Played for Auckland City FC.

References

External links
New Zealand 2004/05 Season Results

Association football clubs in Auckland
Association football clubs established in 2000
2000 establishments in New Zealand
Māngere-Ōtāhuhu Local Board Area